Steakley is a surname. Notable people with the surname include:

Douglas Steakley (born 1944), American metalsmith and photographer
John Steakley (1951–2010), American author
Zollie Steakley (1908–1992), American judge

See also
Steckley